Roger Vaaler (born 23 January 1971) is a Norwegian retired footballer who played as a goalkeeper. He is last known to have worked as head coach of Gjerdrum IL, Under-16 team.

Career

Vaaler started his senior career with Kløfta IL. In 1996, he signed for Skeid Fotball in the Norwegian Tippeligaen, where he made ninety-nine appearances and scored zero goals. After that, he played for English club Bristol Rovers, and Norwegian clubs Stabæk Fotball, Ullensaker/Kisa IL, and Eidsvold TF before retiring.

References 
Footnotes

Sources
 ROGER WANTS EXTENDED ENGLISH STAY
 Football: Hearts set for flutter on keeper; Hearts v Kilmarnock
 Football: JEFF SETS HEART ON NORWAY KEEPER
 Football: HEARTS LINE UP VIKING DOUBLE
 Bruker nesten 400 millioner 
 Imponerte Teitur

External links 
 Kanari-Fansen Lillestrøm Profile 

1971 births
Living people
Norwegian footballers
Association football goalkeepers
Norwegian expatriate footballers
Expatriate footballers in England
Norwegian expatriate sportspeople in England
Bristol Rovers F.C. players
Frigg Oslo FK players
Lillestrøm SK players
Skeid Fotball players
Ullensaker/Kisa IL players
Eliteserien players
Norwegian First Division players